Mount Persenk is the rounded, ice-covered peak rising to 1603 m in Lovech Heights on Nordenskjöld Coast in Graham Land, Antarctica.  It is surmounting Rogosh Glacier to the north, west and south.

The feature is named after Persenk Peak in the Rhodope Mountains, Bulgaria.

Location

British mapping in 1978.

Maps
 Antarctic Digital Database (ADD). Scale 1:250000 topographic map of Antarctica. Scientific Committee on Antarctic Research (SCAR). Since 1993, regularly upgraded and updated.

Notes

References
 Mount Persenk. SCAR Composite Antarctic Gazetteer
 Bulgarian Antarctic Gazetteer. Antarctic Place-names Commission. (details in Bulgarian, basic data in English)

External links
 Mount Persenk. Copernix satellite image

Persenk
Nordenskjöld Coast
Bulgaria and the Antarctic